Presentation Convent School, Peshawar, was founded by the Presentation Sisters and is regulated by the Catholic Board of Education under the Roman Catholic Diocese of Islamabad-Rawalpindi. It is located is 144 kilometers west of the capital Islamabad.

On September 8, 1895, the first Presentation Convent School in the Punjab was opened by three Irish religious sisters. Today in Pakistan there are many Presentation schools catering for the educational needs of around thirteen thousand children in Urdu- and English-medium schools. There are Presentation Convent schools in Rawalpindi, Murree, Jhelum, Sargodha, [[Khushab, Wah, Risalpur, Mingora (Swat), Hassanabdal, and in Tando Allah Yar, Khipro and Tando Adam in Sindh.

In the 1960s it was a girls-only school. The boys' school was called St. Mary's High School, Peshawar. From 1964 to 1970 Mother Malecky, Mother Baptist, and Sister Agatha were the principals.

A bomb hoax created panic in the Presentation Convent School on The Mall on May 10, 2002.

In 2006, a mob attacked the school and set it on fire. A car was badly damaged, school funds, computer equipment, a mobile phone and medicine were stolen. 
Bishop Anthony Lobo of Islamabad-Rawalpindi visited the School on February 16 to assess the damage.

Alumni
 Naseerullah Khan Babar, a former Interior Minister of Pakistan

References

Catholic secondary schools in Pakistan
Schools in Peshawar
Presentation Sisters schools
Private schools in Pakistan